Cheryl Renee Toussaint (born December 16, 1952) is an American athlete who mainly competed in the 800 metres.

She grew up in the Bedford-Stuyvesant neighborhood of Brooklyn, New York, where she attended Erasmus Hall High School, setting the indoor record in the 600-yard run in 1970, the same year she graduated from high school.  She competed for the United States at the 1972 Summer Olympics held in Munich where she won the silver medal in the women's 4 x 400 metres relay with her team mates Mable Fergerson, Madeline Manning and 400 m bronze medalists Kathy Hammond.

In 1987, Toussaint founded Tousse Running Apparel, a company designing custom Team track Apparel. Working with GK Elite Sportswear, Toussaint has developed a line of track and field uniforms that can be custom designed online.

in 2015, Cheryl became the Meet Director for the Colgate Women's Games, the nation's largest track and field series for women.

References

External links
 Tousse Running Apparel

1952 births
American female sprinters
Olympic silver medalists for the United States in track and field
Athletes (track and field) at the 1972 Summer Olympics
Erasmus Hall High School alumni
Sportspeople from Brooklyn
Living people
Medalists at the 1972 Summer Olympics
Pan American Games medalists in athletics (track and field)
Pan American Games gold medalists for the United States
Athletes (track and field) at the 1971 Pan American Games
Medalists at the 1971 Pan American Games
Track and field athletes from New York City
Olympic female sprinters
21st-century American women